Wolf Reik FRS is a German molecular biologist and a group leader at the Babraham Institute, honorary professor of Epigenetics at the University of Cambridge and associate faculty at the Wellcome Trust Sanger Institute. He was announced as the director of Altos Labs Cambridge Institute when the company launched on 19 January 2022.

Career and research
Wolf Reik studies how additional information can be added to the genome through a range of processes collectively called epigenetics. He discovered some of the key epigenetic mechanisms important for mammalian development, physiology, genome reprogramming, and human diseases. His early work led to the discovery that the molecular mechanism of genomic imprinting is based on DNA methylation. He uncovered non-coding RNA and chromatin looping regulating imprinted genes, which he showed to be involved in fetal nutrition, growth, and disease. He found that the environment influences epigenetic programming in embryos, with changes in gene expression persisting in adults and their offspring.

Awards and honours
Wolf Reik has received many awards, including:

 2011, elected member of the Academia Europaea
 2010, elected Fellow of the Royal Society
 2003, elected to EMBO Membership at the European Molecular Biology Organisation
 2003 Elected Fellow of the Academy of Medical Sciences (FMedSci)
 1994 awarded the Wellcome Prize in Physiology

See also 

 Chronomics

References

Academics of the University of Cambridge
German molecular biologists
Living people
Fellows of the Royal Society
Year of birth missing (living people)